Dryadella edwallii is a species of orchid.

edwalii
Taxa named by Alfred Cogniaux